The Division of Lyne is an Australian electoral division in the state of New South Wales.

Geography
Since 1984, federal electoral division boundaries in Australia have been determined at redistributions by a redistribution committee appointed by the Australian Electoral Commission. Redistributions occur for the boundaries of divisions in a particular state, and they occur every seven years, or sooner if a state's representation entitlement changes or when divisions of a state are malapportioned.

It includes the major towns of Forster, Kempsey, Taree and Wauchope, as well as other smaller towns. It covers the entirety of both the Dungog Shire and the Mid-Coast Council, as well as parts of the Port Macquarie-Hastings Council.

History

The division is named after Sir William Lyne, Premier of New South Wales at the time of Federation. He was commissioned by the first Governor-General, Lord Hopetoun to form the inaugural Federal Government, but was unable to attract sufficient support to form a cabinet and returned the commission. The unsuccessful commissioning of Lyne is known as The Hopetoun Blunder. Lyne subsequently served as a minister in the early Protectionist governments.

The Division of Lyne was created in a redistribution in 1949 and was represented by the National Party (previously the Country Party and National Country Party) for almost 60 years. This reflects the area's history as a strongly conservative and rural region. The division covers parts of southern Port Macquarie Hastings City and almost the entire Mid-Coast Council local government areas. The area has recently undergone significant demographic changes with the arrival of a large number of retired people and city dwellers seeking a sea-change. Despite these changes the Australian Labor Party has made little headway in increasing its vote.

In 1993, after the exclusion of minor candidates, the Nationals' Mark Vaile led over the Liberals by only 233 votes on the third count.  Labor had taken a large first-count lead which it held for most of the night, but Vaile won after Liberal preferences flowed overwhelmingly to him.  However, had 120 votes gone the other way, the Liberals would have taken the seat. Vaile later went on to become leader of the Nationals and Deputy Prime Minister during the latter stages of the Howard Government.  He retired in July 2008, triggering a by-election later that year. The seat was lost to independent candidate and former state MP Rob Oakeshott, who retained the seat at the 2010 election.

Oakeshott announced on 26 June 2013 that he would not contest the 2013 election. It was widely expected that the seat would revert to the Nationals; despite Oakeshott's previous personal popularity, Lyne was still a comfortably safe National seat in a "traditional" two-party matchup with Labor. As expected, David Gillespie, who had been Oakeshott's opponent in 2010, easily reclaimed the seat for the Nationals.

Members

Election results

References

External links
Division of Lyne - Australian Electoral Commission

Electoral divisions of Australia
Constituencies established in 1949
1949 establishments in Australia